Rudolf Reiter (born 28 September 1994) is a professional Czech football player currently playing for FC Zbrojovka Brno on loan from Baník Ostrava.

References

External links
 Profile at FC Zbrojovka Brno official site

Czech footballers
1994 births
Living people
Czech First League players
FC Zbrojovka Brno players
Association football midfielders
Footballers from Prague
FK Viktoria Žižkov players
FC Sellier & Bellot Vlašim players
Bohemians 1905 players
FC Baník Ostrava players